Ninnishtam Ennishtam 2 is a 2011 Malayalam-language romance film directed by Alleppey Ashraf, starring newcomers Suresh and Sunitha . It is a sequel to the 1986 film Ninnishtam Ennishtam.

Plot
The film is a sequel to Ninnishtam Ennishtam and the story takes place 25 years from where the first film finished. Sreekuttan, who is the nephew of the original Sreekuttan played by Mohanlal in the original comes to Thiruvananthapuram city and accidentally meets the daughter of Chikku, the lover of old Sreekkuttan, and falls in love. How the identity of the characters get revealed and the ultimate success of the new story forms the rest of the film.

Cast

 Suresh Nair as Sreekuttan
 Sunitha
 Priya as Shalini (Chikku)
 Jagathy Sreekumar
 Mukesh
 Bheeman Raghu
 Suraj Venjarammoodu
  Sukumari
 Kalaranjini
 Kalpana
 Kundara Johny
  Santhakumari
  Krishnaprasad
  Sreenivasan
  Achu
 Poojappura Ravi
  Kottayam Somaraj
  Prasanath Kanjiramattom

Reception
The film was a failure at the Kerala box-office. It received generally negative reviews from critics. Bharatstudent site gave the film a rating of (1.25/5), observing that the film has a thoughtless storyline with a poor presentation.

References

External links
 Nowrunning - Critics' review
 Kottaka article
 FilmyDum article on the sequel

2010s Malayalam-language films
2011 romance films
2011 films
Indian sequel films
Ninnishtam2
Films shot in Thiruvananthapuram
Films directed by Alleppey Ashraf
Indian romance films